Le Dernier Cri is a Marseille based publishing house focused on publishing books, prints, silkscreens, posters and original art of visual artists that produce underground art. Pakito Bolino and Caroline Sury started the organisation in 1992. Besides publishing art le Dernier Cri also sets up other activities such as film screening, and expositions.

They have published works of Matthias Lehmann, Mike Diana, Fredox, Marcel Ruijters, Pakito Bolino, Caroline Sury, Henriette Valium, Ichiba Daisuke, Matti Hagelberg, Stu Mead, Blexbolex, Quentin Faucompré, Moolinex, Charles Burns, Keiti Ota, Reinhard Scheibner, Frédéric Poincelet, Nuvish, Les Frères Guedin, Atak, Jonathon Rosen, Rémi, Kerozen, Laetitia Brochier, Stéphane Blanquet, Francis Masse, Manuel Ocampo, Andy Bolus, Dave 2000, Sven Baslev.

In 2014 the organisation organised a big exhibition called Mangaro about 40 years of underground manga in La Friche. Artists of the Dernier Cri collectif have also decorated the walls inside the underground music venue l'Embobineuse.

Documentation 
 French interview with Pakito Bolino about the start up of le Dernier Cri

References 
 Revue étapes graphiques:119, avril 2005 
 Revue Bananafish, novembre 2004  (archived)
 Revue Artension, juillet-août 2004 
 Revue Print Mag, juillet-août 2004 
 Télérama n°2797, 20 août 2003

External links 
 www.lederniercri.org

Underground comix